Charles William Rattray (9 July 1863 – 8 June 1939) was a New Zealand cricketer. He played twelve first-class matches for Otago between 1883 and 1897.

Rattray was born in Dunedin and educated at Christ's College, Christchurch. He was "a free and stylish batsman, with a fine off drive", but his batting success at first-class level was limited, with a top score of 23. He was, however, a successful captain of Otago for several years. 

Rattray was a prominent businessman in Dunedin. He was chairman of directors of the wholesale grocery and spirits company founded by his father, and served on the boards of several major national companies. He was also vice-consul for Portugal for over 30 years. He married Gertrude Emeline Neill in Dunedin on 5 February 1896. They had a son and a daughter.

See also
 List of Otago representative cricketers

References

External links
 

1863 births
1939 deaths
New Zealand cricketers
Otago cricketers
Cricketers from Dunedin
People educated at Christ's College, Christchurch
New Zealand businesspeople in retailing
Corporate directors